The National Dance Awards 2003, were organised and presented by The Critics' Circle, and were awarded to recognise excellence in professional dance in the United Kingdom.  The ceremony was held at Sadler's Wells Theatre, London, on 13 January 2004, with awards given for productions staged in the previous year.

Awards presented
 De Valois Award for Outstanding Achievement in Dance - Val Bourne, Artistic Director of Dance Umbrella
 Best Male Dancer - Carlos Acosta of The Royal Ballet
 Best Female Dancer - Zenaida Yanowsky of The Royal Ballet
 Audience Award - Adam Cooper
 Sunday Express Children's Award - Harry Walker, Tap Dancer
 Dance UK Industry Award - Theresa Beattie, Director of Artist Development at The Place
 Best Choreography (Classical) - Michael Corder for English National Ballet
 Best Choreography (Modern) - Akram Khan, for his own company
 Best Choreography (Musical Theatre) - Adam Cooper for On Your Toes
 Outstanding Female Artist (Modern) - Ana Lujan Sanchez of Rambert Dance Company
 Outstanding Male Artist (Modern) - Henry Montes of Siobhan Davies Dance Company
 Outstanding Female Artist (Classical) - Oxana Panchenko of George Piper Dances
 Outstanding Male Artist (Classical) - Robert Parker of Birmingham Royal Ballet
 Company Prize for Outstanding Repertoire (Classical) - English National Ballet
 Company Prize for Outstanding Repertoire (Modern) - Scottish Dance Theatre
 Best Foreign Dance Company - Paul Taylor Dance Company from United States of America

Special awards
Special awards were presented to the following people for excellence in their particular field of dance that would not be recognised by existing award categories.

 Lez Brotherston, Designer

References

National Dance Awards
Dance
Dance